Kosmos 362 ( meaning Cosmos 362), also known as DS-P1-I No.9 was a satellite which was used as a radar target for anti-ballistic missile tests. It was launched by the Soviet Union in 1970 as part of the Dnepropetrovsk Sputnik programme.

Launch 
It was launched aboard a Kosmos-2I 63SM rocket, from Site 133/1 at Plesetsk. The launch occurred at 11:59:55 UTC on 16 September 1970.

Orbit 
It decayed from orbit on 13 October 1971.

Kosmos 362 was the ninth of nineteen DS-P1-I satellites to be launched. Of these, all reached orbit successfully except the seventh.

References

Kosmos satellites
1970 in the Soviet Union
Spacecraft launched in 1970
Dnepropetrovsk Sputnik program